K-1 World Grand Prix 2003 Final Elimination was a kickboxing event promoted by the K-1 organization. The event was held at the Osaka Dome in Osaka, Japan on Saturday, October 11, 2003 in front of 31,700 spectators. It was the final elimination competition for the K-1 World Grand Prix 2003, involving fourteen fighters from across the world, with all bouts being fought under K-1 Rules (100 kg/156-220 lbs). The fourteen fighters were a mixture of invitees or had qualified via previous events (for more information on this see the bulleted list below).

As well as elimination fights there was also a 'Super Fight' between Bjorn Bregy and Michael McDonald fought under K-1 Rules.  In total there were sixteen fighters at the event, representing eleven countries.

The seven elimination fight winners would qualify for the K-1 World Grand Prix 2003 final where they would join K-1 Survival 2003 Japan Grand Prix Final winner Musashi.  Super fight winner Bjorn Bregy and losing elimination fighter Carter Williams would also be invited as reservists.

Qualifiers
Cyril Abidi - K-1 World Grand Prix 2003 in Paris runner up
Peter Aerts - Invitee (at last years tournament)
Mike Bernardo - Invitee
Remy Bonjasky - K-1 World Grand Prix 2003 in Las Vegas II winner
Francois Botha - Invitee
Francisco Filho - Invitee
Sam Greco - Invitee
Peter Graham - K-1 World Grand Prix 2003 in Melbourne winner
Alexey Ignashov - K-1 World Grand Prix 2003 in Paris winner
Stefan Leko - Invitee (at last years tournament)
Bob Sapp - Invitee (at last years tournament)
Ray Sefo - Invitee (at last years tournament)
Jerrel Venetiaan - K-1 World Grand Prix 2003 in Basel winner
Carter Williams - K-1 World Grand Prix 2003 in Las Vegas winner

Results 

Super Fight: K-1 Rules / 3Min. 3R Ext.2R
Bjorn Bregy  vs Michael McDonald 
Bregy defeated McDonald by KO (Knee Strike, 3 Knockdowns) at 2:50 of the 1st Round

Elimination Fights: K-1 Rules / 3Min. 3R Ext.2R
Ray Sefo  vs Carter Williams 
Sefo defeated Williams by 2nd Round Decision 2-0 (20-19, 20-19, 19-19) after being unable to continue due to injury

Peter Graham  vs Sam Greco 
Graham defeated Greco by TKO (Corner Stoppage) at 0:30 of the 2nd Round

Mike Bernardo  vs Alexey Ignashov 
Ignashov defeated Bernardo by KO (Right Punch & Right Low Kick) at 2:21 of the 2nd Round

Peter Aerts  vs Jerrel Venetiaan 
Aerts defeated Venetiaan by 3rd Round Unanimous Decision 3-0 (30-29, 30-29, 30-28)

Francisco Filho  vs Stefan Leko 
Leko defeated Filho by 3rd Round Unanimous Decision 3-0 (30-28, 30-29, 29-28)

Cyril Abidi  vs Francois Botha 
Abidi defeated Botha by disqualification at 0:19 of the 1st Round

Remy Bonjasky  vs Bob Sapp 
Bonjasky defeated Sapp by disqualification at 1:20 of the 2nd Round

See also
List of K-1 events
List of male kickboxers

References

External links
K-1sport.de - Your Source for Everything K-1
K-1 Official Website
Kickboxing.com, kickboxing martial arts, mma, mixed martial arts information site

K-1 events
2003 in kickboxing
Kickboxing in Japan
Sport in Osaka